Quick, as an adjective, refers to something moving with high speed.

Quick may also refer to:

In business
 Quick (restaurant), a Belgian fast-food restaurant chain
 Quick (sportswear), a Dutch manufacturer of sportswear
 Quick (automobile), an early American automobile
 QIC (data backup) Quarter inch Cartridge, pronounced quick

Music
 The Quick (U.S. band), a rock band from Los Angeles
 The Quick (UK band), a pop band from England
 Quick (dance group), a hip hop dance group
 Quick (album), a 1994 independently released album by Far

Films
 Quick (1932 film), German film starring Lilian Harvey
 Quick (1993 film), American crime film starring Teri Polo
 Quick (2011 film), South Korean film
 Quick (2019 film),, also known as The Perfect Patient, Swedish film

Publications
 Quick (German magazine), published 1948–1992
 Quick (newspaper), a defunct free weekly tabloid in the Dallas-Fort Worth area from 2003 to 2011

In sports
 AHC Quick, also known as Quick Amsterdam, a baseball and softball club based in Amsterdam, the Netherlands
 Quick 1888, also known as Quick Nijmegen, an amateur sporting club from Nijmegen, the Netherlands
 Colloquial term for a fast bowler in cricket

People and fictional characters
 Quick (surname), a list of people and fictional characters
 James Murphy (gridiron football) (born 1959), retired Canadian Football League player nicknamed "Quick"
 James "Quick" Parker (1958–2018), Canadian Football League player
 James Tillis (born 1957), American boxer nicknamed "Quick"

Places in the United States
 Quick, Nebraska, an unincorporated community
 Quick, West Virginia, an unincorporated community

Other uses
 Quick, an informal name for the hyponychium, a sensitive region of skin between the fingertip and the free edge of the fingernail
 USS Quick (DD-490), a US Navy ship during World War II
 QUICK scheme (Quadratic Upstream Interpolation for Convective Kinematics), in computational fluid dynamics
 Quiz for Improving Crew Knowledge, used in railway crew management in India for evaluation of crew knowledge

See also
 Quickening (disambiguation)
 Quik (disambiguation)
 QUIC, Internet protocol